Matteo Gritti (born 11 June 1980) is an Italian retired footballer who played as a goalkeeper.

He is not to be confused with Serie C2 player Matteo Gritti (born 1986).

Career
Born in Seriate, about 4 km southeast of Bergamo, Gritti started his career at Serie D club Bassano Virtus before returned to Lombardy for Atalanta Bergamo. After two seasons at their youth teams, Gritti moved back to Serie D for Oggiono, which also located in Lombardy. He played for the club as regular starter before signed for Serie C1 club Alzano, his third Lombardy club. He then signed by the Province of Bergamo based AlbinoLeffe, which in 2002–03 in the same group with Alzano, but Alzano relegated and AlbinoLeffe promoted.

At AlbinoLeffe, he worked as backup for another Province of Bergamo native, Paolo Acerbis.

In 2004–05 season, he played for his 6th Lombardy club Palazzolo at Serie C2.

In mid-2005, he abroad to Switzerland for AC Lugano, which from Ticino, an Italian speaking region. His performance made Swiss giant BSC Young Boys signed him, worked as Marco Wölfli's backup. After Young Boys re-signed their youth product Paolo Collaviti as new backup goalkeeper, Gritti went on loan to Chiasso of Ticino.

After a loan spells at Challenge League, he signed for Swiss Super League newcomer AC Bellinzona in July 2008. He became the no.1 goalkeeper ahead Lorenzo Bucchi at the start of season, but Bucchi regain his place until the arrival of former A.S. Roma goalkeeper Carlo Zotti. Gritti was released on 30 June 2011.

In February 2012, Gritti signed a contract with Petrolul Ploieşti, in Liga I, until the end of the season. He played only three games for Petrolul, and his contract wasn't renewed.

External links
Profile at Swiss Super League  
AC Bellinzona profile 
 From great European football to precarious life The story of Matteo Gritti

1980 births
Living people
People from Seriate
Italian footballers
Association football goalkeepers
Italian expatriate footballers
Atalanta B.C. players
U.C. AlbinoLeffe players
BSC Young Boys players
FC Lugano players
FC Chiasso players
AC Bellinzona players
Bassano Virtus 55 S.T. players
Virtus Bergamo Alzano Seriate 1909 players
FC Petrolul Ploiești players
Swiss Super League players
Liga I players
Expatriate footballers in Switzerland
Expatriate footballers in Romania
Italian expatriate sportspeople in Switzerland
Italian expatriate sportspeople in Romania
Sportspeople from the Province of Bergamo
Footballers from Lombardy